The Latitude is a private housing estate in San Po Kong, Hong Kong. It was developed by Sun Hung Kai Properties and was completed in 2010.

A 1-room flat was sold for HK$6.95 million in November 2016, and a 2-room was sold for HK$10.05 million in February 2017.

The podium of the estate is home to Mikiki, a shopping mall.

Facilities 
The Latitude contains a clubhouse called Club Latitude. Features in the Clubhouse include an outdoor swimming pool, an indoor swimming pool, a restaurant, a children's playroom and a home cinema.

References

Private housing estates in Hong Kong
Sun Hung Kai Properties
San Po Kong